Masrakh Assembly constituency  was an assembly constituency in Saran district in the Indian state of Bihar.

Overview
As a consequence of the orders of the Delimitation Commission of India, Masrakh Assembly constituency ceased to exist in 2010.

Election results

1972-2010
In the October 2005 state assembly elections Kedar Nath Singh of JD(U) won the Masrakh assembly seat defeating his nearest rival, Tarakeshwar Singh of Congress. Contests in most years were multi cornered but only winners and runners are being mentioned. Tarakeshwar Singh, Independent/ RJD defeated Kedar Nath Singh of JD(U)/ (Samajwadi Party|SAP) in February 2005 and 2000. Ashok Singh of JD defeated Prabhunath Singh of BPP in 1995. Prabhunath Singh of JD/ Independent defeated Harendra Kishore Singh of Congress in 1990 and 1985. Ram Deo Singh of Congress defeated Kashi Nath Rai of Congress (U) in 1980. Krishnadeo Narain Singh of JP defeated Kashi Nath Rai, Independent, in 1977.

References

Former assembly constituencies of Bihar
Politics of Saran district